Spencer William Toone II (born August 25, 1980) is a former American football player and coach. He played as a linebacker and was selected by the Tennessee Titans in the last round of the 2006 NFL Draft. Toone played college football at the University of Utah. He finished his career at Utah with 293 tackles. Toone served as the defensive coordinator at Idaho State University from 2013 to 2017.

High school years
Toone attended Snake River High School in Blackfoot, Idaho, and was a student and a letterman in football, basketball, baseball and track. In football, he led his teams to two Idaho State Championships and was a two-time All-State selection.

References

External links
 Idaho State profile
 

1980 births
Living people
American football linebackers
Idaho State Bengals football coaches
Ricks Vikings football players
Tennessee Titans players
Utah State Aggies football coaches
Utah Utes football players
People from Blackfoot, Idaho
People from Idaho Falls, Idaho
Coaches of American football from Idaho
Players of American football from Idaho